Issam al-Said (1938-1988) was a distinguished Iraqi painter, print-maker, designer, etcher, architect, philosopher and author who completed several major public buildings in Baghdad and in London.

Life and career 

Issam al-Said was born in Baghdad in 1938 into an influential family. He was the second son of Iraqi parents, Sabah Nuri al-Said and Esmat Ali Pasha Fahmi (who was of Egyptian ancestry) and the grandson of Nuri al-Said Pasha (Iraq's Prime Minister, 1930–58). As an adult, his older brother, Falah, was the personal pilot to King Hussein. Both his father and grand-father were brutally killed during the 1958 revolution.

He studied architecture at Cambridge University, graduating in 1961 and also studied at the Hammersmith College of Art and Design, London in 1962-4. He began preparing for a PhD on the Methodology of Geometric Proportioning in Islamic Architecture at the University of Newcastle-upon-Tyne in 1988 but died, in London, before he could complete it. The work was published posthumously.

Work
He was a versatile artist who, in addition to major public buildings completed in London and Baghdad, also designed furniture including lamps, carpets, tiles, furniture, etc. From the 1960s, he began incorporating kufi script into his artworks, thereby joining the growing ranks of hurufiyya artists developing this style in the Middle East and North Africa in the 1950s and 60s.

His artworks are held in international collections, both private and public, including prestigious art museums such as: The British Museum, Victoria and Albert Museum (London), Museum of Modern Art (MOMA), New York; National Museum of Modern Art (Baghdad) and the National Museum of Modern Art (Amman, Jordan).

Select list of architectural works

 Central Mosque, London, 1976-77 
 Islamic Cultural Centre, London, 1976–77 
 Aloussi Mosque, Baghdad, 1982–83
 Al-Aboud Mosque, Baghdad, 1984

Select list of paintings
 Head of Christ, watercolour, pen, ink & oil on paper on board, 25x16cm, c. 1959 
 Sodom and Gomorrah, 1962
 Medinat al Hub, Oil on canvas 102x153cm 1963 (Inspired by Nazik Al-Malaika's poem Medinat al-Hub)  
 Geometric Multiples, enamel on aluminium, 1979
  At the Door, made of prints, 1979
 Wa la Ghaliba illa Allah, 1962-1974
 Allah al-Kalima , Mixed media and oil on canvas, 50x50cm, 196 
 Kufic IV, date unknown
 Three Women, aquatinta etching, date unknown

Publications
 Islamic Art and Architecture: The System of Geometric Design, 1993 (published posthumously and based on his PhD dissertation)  
 Geometric Concepts in Islamic Art,World of Islam Festival, London, 1976  (co-authored with A. Parman)

Legacy 
He is the subject of the book, Issam El-Said: Artist and Scholar by Samir Chorbachi Published by Issam El-Said Foundation, 1989 (two editions in English and Arabic)

See also
 Iraqi art
 List of Iraqi artists
 List of mosques in Iraq

References

20th-century Iraqi painters
Artists from Baghdad
Iraqi architects
Iraqi calligraphers
Iraqi designers
Iraqi contemporary artists
1938 births
1988 deaths